Nicolette Bird is an Indian actress and model who has had roles in the Bollywood films Rock On!!, released in 2008, and Striker, released in early 2010. As a model, she has appeared in television commercials and magazine advertisements in India.

Career 
Bird has done many ad campaigns and music videos, and was seen in Rock On!! as Tanya. She was seen in the Amaan and Ayaan Ali Khan music video called "Pathway To The Unknown." She has done ads for Honda Shire, Garnier, Elle 18, Maruti Swift, Doy Care, and has featured in an item song in the Telugu movie Boss, I Love You. Her next movie was Striker (2010), a Hindi film in which she played Noori, a conservative Muslim.

Filmography

Personal life
Bird is a daughter of Edwina Bird and Nicholas Bird of Calcutta. Her father, who is retired, was a jockey in India. Her mother is a consultant in Calcutta for Databazaar.com, an office supply company based in Miramar, Florida.

Nicolette Bird was introduced to her spouse, Ravi Mehta, by a mutual friend at a Mumbai hotel in February 2008. He was on a business trip and was about to return to the United States. Mehta, who was born in Colorado and grew up in Japan, went to Mumbai every couple of months on business; they began seeing each other.

References

External links 
 

Year of birth missing (living people)
Female models from Kolkata
Indian film actresses
Actresses in Hindi cinema
Living people
21st-century Indian actresses